Zavetny (masculine), Zavetnaya (feminine), or Zavetnoye (neuter) is the name of several rural localities in Russia:
Zavetny (rural locality), a settlement in Zavetny Rural Okrug under the administrative jurisdiction of the City of Armavir, Krasnodar Krai
Zavetnoye, Krasnodar Krai, a settlement in Protichkinsky Rural Okrug of Krasnoarmeysky District of Krasnodar Krai
Zavetnoye, Leningrad Oblast, a logging depot settlement in Sevastyanovskoye Settlement Municipal Formation of Priozersky District of Leningrad Oblast
Zavetnoye, Primorsky Krai, a selo in Chuguyevsky District of Primorsky Krai
Zavetnoye, Rostov Oblast, a selo in Zavetinskoye Rural Settlement of Zavetinsky District of Rostov Oblast
Zavetnoye, Saratov Oblast, a selo in Volsky District of Saratov Oblast
Zavetnoye, Stavropol Krai, a selo in Zavetnensky Selsoviet of Kochubeyevsky District of Stavropol Krai